The Vikingland Band Festival parade marching championship is held
annually in Alexandria, Minnesota on the last Sunday of June. The
event was founded in 1985 and is widely regarded as the midwest's biggest
and most prestigious summer marching band competition. It is often regarded
as the unofficial state championship for parade marching in Minnesota.

The parade features only marching bands. It does not include floats or
other units commonly associated with parades. Bands march at a
three-block interval to prevent their music from blending together. 
Alexandria's extra-wide main street provides an outstanding venue for 
the performances.

A panel of six judges provides taped feedback and scores for each band.
Placement awards are presented to every band, with the top band in each
class earning the distinction of Class Champion. The overall high
scoring band of the day is named the Grand Champion. Each champion band
is awarded a traveling flag to carry for one year. If a band wins its
champion title for three consecutive years, the band earns the right to
keep the flag. Caption awards are presented for the top wind section,
percussion section and color guard in each class.

One band is named the "People's Choice" by a panel of non-professional
judges.

Participants

The Vikingland Band Festival has drawn 95 different bands since its
inception in 1985. Participants have come from seven different states
(Minnesota, Wisconsin, Iowa, Colorado, South Carolina, South Dakota,
Michigan), three Canadian provinces (Alberta, Manitoba, Saskatchewan), and Norway (five times).

Although many of the performing bands are experienced competitors with
long-standing traditions of excellence, the festival welcomes younger
bands as well. Organizers believe the education, intensity, and
sportsmanship can provide a valuable experience for any band.

The tradition of including non-competing "honor bands" in the parade was
started in 1989 as a way to showcase a variety of marching styles.
Styles represented have included foreign bands, military bands,
bagpipes, drum and bugle corps, and percussion lines.

History
Eight different bands have earned the title of Grand Champion: 

Long Prairie (1985)

Henry Sibley High School (1986, 2018, 2019)

Litchfield (1987, 1988, 1989, 1990, 1998)

Irondale High School (1991, 1992, 1993, 1994, 1995, 1996)

Park Center High School (1997, 1999, 2001, 2003, 2007, 2008, 2011, 2012)

Mankato 77 Lancers (2000, 2002, 2010)

Waconia Marching Band (2004, 2005, 2006, 2009, 2016, 2022)
 
728 Cadets (2013, 2014, 2015, 2017)

No awards were presented during the COVID-19 pandemic in 2020 (online video format) nor in 2021 (live event with ratings-only format and no awards ceremony). Competition resumed in 2022. 

Since 1989 the festival has presented traveling flags to the Grand Champion and Class Champion bands. A band can retire a flag in its honor by winning the title three consecutive years. Four bands have retired Grand Champion flags: Litchfield (1989), Irondale (1993, 1996), Waconia (2006), and the 728 Cadets (2015). Eleven bands have retired Class Champion flags: Bertha-Hewitt (1990, 1997), Dassel-Cokato (2019), Irondale (1993, 1996), Kerkhoven-Murdock-Sunburg (2011, 2014, 2017, 2022), Litchfield (1989, 1992, 1995, 1998, 2002), Long Prairie (1989, 1995, 1998), Park Center (1999, 2007), Sauk Rapids-Rice (2009), Winona Cotter (1994, 2006), Waconia (2015), and the 728 Cadets (2015).

Participants and spectators have developed traditions surrounding the
event, such as intense last-minute rehearsals, potluck meals along the
parade route, and a spirited awards ceremony.

The event has inspired other communities across the state to start
similar parade competitions.

External links
Vikingland Band Festival Official Website
Vikingland Band Festival on Facebook

Parades in the United States
Music festivals in Minnesota
Recurring events established in 1985
Tourist attractions in Douglas County, Minnesota
1985 establishments in Minnesota